Medvin is a surname. Notable people with the surname include:

 Marina Medvin, American attorney
 Scott Medvin (born 1961), American baseball pitcher